Neamphamide A is an HIV-inhibitory isolate of the sea sponge Neamphius huxleyi.

References

Depsipeptides